Horseheads is a historic railway depot located at Horseheads, Chemung County, New York.  It was built in 1866 by the Northern Central Railway (NCRY). The train station was operated by the NCRY and its successor, the Pennsylvania Railroad, until 1956.  The Italianate style building is significant architecturally and historically as a representative of a 19th-century railroad depot.

After being closed by the railroad, the depot was purchased by the local feed mill, where it was used for storage for many decades until it was sold to be used as a retail location in 1994. The interior space has been slightly modified and the original wood floors have been replaced by cement ones, but it remains mostly as built.  The Horseheads Historical Society purchased the depot in 1995 and started the restoration process in 1997. The new depot museum officially opened on September 18, 1999. The Historical Society now operates a museum and small rental space in the station. 

It was added to the National Register of Historic Places in 1996 as the Chemung Railway Depot--Horseheads.

Gallery

References

Italianate architecture in New York (state)
Former railway stations in New York (state)
Railway stations in the United States opened in 1866
Railway stations closed in 1956
Railway stations on the National Register of Historic Places in New York (state)
Former Pennsylvania Railroad stations
Transportation buildings and structures in Chemung County, New York
1866 establishments in New York (state)
National Register of Historic Places in Chemung County, New York